Harry Kewell (born 22 September 1978) is an Australian association football coach, manager and former player. His most recent role as a club manager was at English National League side Barnet, and he is currently a first team coach at Celtic. 

As a player, Kewell represented Leeds United, Liverpool, Galatasaray, Melbourne Victory, Al-Gharafa and Melbourne Heart. While at Leeds he was named the PFA Young Player of the Year in 2000. Internationally, he received 58 caps, and scored 17 goals while playing for Australia. A left winger also capable of playing as an attacking midfielder or second striker, he is often regarded within the media as "Australia's finest football export", despite his career being blighted with injury. In 2012, Kewell was named Australia's greatest footballer in a vote by Australian fans, players and media.

Kewell scored a goal against Croatia which took Australia through to the knockout stages of the 2006 FIFA World Cup, the Australian national team's second World Cup. He is a member of the Executive Committee of the Australian Professional Footballers' Association. Kewell also has a British passport through his father's heritage. Former Middlesbrough midfielder-turned pundit Robbie Mustoe named Kewell as one of the greatest players he had played against but questioned his consistency and attitude after his initial injuries. Former German international Michael Ballack has also highlighted Kewell's ability and inconsistency.

Kewell has represented Australia at the 1995 FIFA U-17 World Championship, the 1997 FIFA Confederations Cup, where Australia finished runners-up, the 2004 OFC Nations Cup, which Australia claimed for the fourth time, the 2006 FIFA World Cup, the 2007 AFC Asian Cup, the 2010 FIFA World Cup and the 2011 AFC Asian Cup, where Australia finished runners-up.

Early life
Harry Kewell was born on 22 September 1978 in Sydney, New South Wales, to an English father, Rod, and an Australian mother, Helen. Harry grew up supporting Liverpool in English football's First Division. Kewell received his early schooling at Smithfield Public School and secondary schooling at St. Johns Park High School before transferring to Westfield Sports High School. Before becoming a teenager he played junior football for Smithfield Hotspurs (now Fairfield Hotspurs) before switching to Marconi Fairfield as a teenager.

Club career

Early career (1993)
At age 14, Kewell travelled to Thailand, Italy and England with the successful Marconi under-14 team that had recently won the state titles. The team played games against the junior team of Milan, as well as apprenticeship sides in England. This was the first time Kewell had been out of the country but provided him his first taste of football in Europe, having also attended a Premier League match for the first time as a spectator. At age 15, Kewell was offered the opportunity to travel back to England and trial with Premiership football club Leeds United for a period of four weeks as part of the Big Brother Movement in Australia. Kewell travelled to England with his future Socceroo teammate Brett Emerton. Both were successful during their trials at Leeds, however only Kewell was able to take up the club's offer due to his father's English heritage, which satisfied the visa requirements.

Leeds United (1993–2003)

Kewell played for three seasons in the Leeds United youth team. His first match for the youth team was against Sunderland in 1995, and he scored his first hat-trick against Rotherham on 7 December 1996. Kewell was handed his first team debut at age 17 in a 1–0 home defeat against Middlesbrough on 30 March 1996. In 1997, Kewell was part of the Leeds United youth-team that claimed the 1996–97 FA Youth Cup final in a 3–1 aggregate win against Crystal Palace. The first goal he scored for Leeds came some time later, in October 1997, in a 3–1 League Cup victory over Stoke City. Around that time, he was flatmates with Leeds goalkeeper Nicky Byrne, who would later become a member of boyband Westlife.

Kewell was sent off in the Leeds United-Galatasaray 1999–2000 UEFA Cup semi-final match. Playing mostly in a left midfield role and in attack, Kewell became one of Leeds' young stars in a troop of highly promising youngsters, eventually playing alongside fellow Australian Mark Viduka.

In the 1999–2000 season, on the back of his most successful season at Leeds where he also won PFA Young Player of the Year was selected in the PFA Team of the Year, Italian giants Internazionale had bid £25 million for Kewell, but Leeds rejected the offer, citing his value to their side. The high point of this period was when Kewell helped Leeds to the semi-final of the UEFA Champions League in 2000–01. The club, however, began to suffer financial difficulties and, by 2002–03, having sold many of their best players, Kewell's efforts in front of goal merely delayed Leeds' slide from being relegated from the Premiership. Kewell's efforts at Leeds United gained him international recognition for his talents. He scored 45 goals in over 180 appearances for Leeds over eight years.

Kewell left Leeds under acrimonious circumstances. In an interview given to the BBC shortly before his move to Liverpool, Kewell strongly criticised the staff at the club, stating that the medical staff loved Lucas Radebe and that his teammates had ostracised him.

Liverpool (2003–2008)
Having rejected more financially enticing offers from Milan, Chelsea, Manchester United, Arsenal and Barcelona, Kewell moved to the club he supported as a boy, Liverpool, for the start of the 2003–04 season. Kewell was handed the famous number seven shirt, surrendered by Vladimír Šmicer.

Kewell's transfer was controversial because it was alleged by former England captain Gary Lineker in an article in July 2003 that a significant portion (£2 million of the £5 million) went to Kewell's unregistered agent Bernie Mandic to ensure that he ended up at Anfield. In a related matter, Kewell sued Lineker in 2005 for defamation of character, but, with the jury unable to agree on a verdict, the parties had to settle out of court.

Kewell made his debut for Liverpool in the opening game of the 2003–04 Premier League season, a 2–1 home loss to Chelsea on 17 August 2003. Kewell scored his first ever goal for Liverpool in a 3–0 away win over great rivals Everton in the Merseyside derby with a great first time strike. Kewell completed his first ever season at Anfield equal second with Emile Heskey by scoring seven goals, nine behind Michael Owen as Liverpool's top goalscorer for the 2003–04 Premier League season. Kewell also finished as Liverpool's top scorer in the 2003–04 UEFA Cup, scoring goals against Olimpija Ljubljana, Steaua București and Levski Sofia which ended Kewell's season total of ten goals. Kewell kicked off his 2004–05 season poorly, failing to score in his first 14 matches, due to injury problems. He did finally score his first goal in round 15 of the Premier League in a 1–1 away draw against Aston Villa, and that was his only Premier League goal of the season, making this one of his worst seasons ever. Kewell started and played in the 2005 League Cup final and the 2005 Champions League final.

On 25 May 2005, Kewell became the first Australian-born player (Craig Johnston was born in South Africa) to win a major UEFA competition, when he became the only Australian to win the UEFA Champions League, playing in Liverpool's win over Milan in the 2005 Champions League final on penalties. Kewell was controversially selected by manager Rafael Benítez ahead of the defensive midfielder Dietmar Hamann, signalling the club's intent to attack from the outset. The gamble proved unsuccessful, and an injured Kewell was substituted early in the first half with a torn abductor muscle. Liverpool were losing 1–0 at the time and Kewell was booed off the pitch by Liverpool fans with many suggesting he had faked the injury. It also emerged during the summer of 2005 that Kewell had been playing throughout the season with an undiagnosed sports hernia, also known as "Gilmore's groin". His record as the only Australian to win a major UEFA tournament came to an end on 18 May 2022 when Ajdin Hrustic became the second Australian to win a UEFA competition, though this occurred in the UEFA Europa League.

In November 2005, after recovering from the injury sustained during the final, Kewell spoke to the official Liverpool website, saying that he had a strong desire to repay his manager Rafael Benítez for showing confidence in him by fielding him in the Champions League final. He also thanked his wife and friends for the support shown to him while he recovered from injury. He also re-stated the severity of the injury which had forced him off in the final and told his doubters that they were misguided to question the severity of his injury.

Kewell's form for Liverpool in the 2005–06 FA Premier League season showed what he was truly capable of, scoring goals and plenty of assists, lending support to his assertion that his prior mediocre performance was the result of poor health rather than apathy. Kewell scored his first league goal at Anfield in over two years when Liverpool beat Tottenham Hotspur 1–0 in January, he was also the only scorer when Liverpool beat Manchester City 1–0 at Anfield and scored the last goal in a 3–1 win over derby rivals Everton just under a month later. Kewell was also one of Liverpool's best performers in the FA Cup semi-final win over Chelsea which Liverpool won 2–1.

Kewell played in the 2006 FA Cup final, only to be substituted in the 48th minute due to abdominal pains (the supporters reaction this time was more sympathetic compared to the previous year's Champions League final). It was later confirmed by Liverpool that he had torn a groin muscle, but was expected to be fit for the 2006 FIFA World Cup.

On 30 April 2007, Kewell made his comeback after almost a year out of club football. He came on as a 55th-minute substitute for Liverpool Reserves in a "mini-derby" against Everton Reserves. On 5 May 2007, he came on as a substitute in the second half of Liverpool's match against Fulham at Craven Cottage, having not played for Liverpool since his substitution in the 2006 FA Cup final. On 13 May 2007, Kewell came on as a substitute in the second half against Charlton Athletic in the last match of the Premier League season, where he scored his last ever goal for the club. Speculation on whether he was to be selected in Liverpool's upcoming Champions League final in Athens rapidly became positive for Kewell after providing an excellent game against Charlton. Kewell provided a cross in for Dirk Kuyt to assist towards a Xabi Alonso goal and then scored a penalty on the 90th minute. He played in the Champions League final in Athens, appearing as a second-half substitute for Boudewijn Zenden, however Liverpool lost the final 2–1 to Milan.

Kewell was injured for the start of the 2007–08 season, and he faced an uncertain future at Liverpool having suffered yet another injury, which sidelined him for the first month of the Premier League season. Kewell returned as a substitute in Liverpool's League Cup victory over Cardiff City on 31 October, coming on in the 71st minute. He then came on as a substitute in the Premier League and Champions League against Blackburn and Beşiktaş respectively. Kewell put in a great performance by setting up two goals for Fernando Torres and Dirk Kuyt as Liverpool beat Marseille in impressive fashion 4–0 away victory to secure qualification to the knockout phase of the Champions League. After his return, Liverpool manager Rafael Benítez stated on the club's website and to other members of the media that a new contract for Kewell to continue his career at Anfield was not out of the question. Many believed that if Kewell could stay injury free until the season's end he would be offered the chance to remain with the club.

Kewell found himself unable to make the team after Liverpool's FA Cup defeat to Barnsley. His chances of a new contract were hindered, however; when seeking games and match fitness, he travelled with his national team to play in a game against Singapore. Kewell returned to England with a groin strain, unfortunately leaving less time to prove himself worthy of a new deal. His first goal of the 2007–08 season was for the Liverpool reserve team in their 2–0 win over rivals Manchester United. Because of injuries, his future at Liverpool was uncertain. In May 2008, it was revealed Liverpool would not be offering Kewell a new contract at the club.

Galatasaray (2008–2011)
On 5 July 2008, reigning Turkish Süper Lig champions Galatasaray signed Kewell to a two-year contract, presenting him with the number 19 shirt.

Upon signing, Kewell said, "I wanted to move on and this is the best way. I can't wait to get started, it's just what I'm looking forward to, a new challenge." His transfer to Galatasaray provoked strong criticism from fans and teammates of his former club Leeds United as he was a Leeds player when two of their fans were murdered in attacks before a UEFA Cup semi-final against Galatasaray in Istanbul in April 2000. Kewell responded and in an open letter he stated, "I chose the No 19 shirt when I signed for Galatasaray SK as a sign of respect for Leeds because that was the number I got when I first became a regular member of the Leeds United starting XI. I felt that it might be a way to demonstrate that I had not forgotten where it all started and I was hoping that in a small way it would help the healing process of the tragedy that occurred on 5 April 2000. To blame the Galatasaray club for the tragedy in Istanbul is simply wrong and discriminatory."

Kewell made his debut for Galatasaray in the Turkish Super Cup where he came on as a substitute on the 66th minute, scoring his first goal for Galatasaray just 20 seconds later with his first touch in the 2–1 win over Kayserispor, while also providing the assist for the second goal. His second goal for the club came in the first league match of the season against Denizlispor, which Galatasaray won 4–1. On 23 October 2008, Kewell scored the only goal in Galatasaray's UEFA Cup win over Olympiacos. One week later, Kewell played in Galatasaray's first Turkish Cup match where they drew 1–1 with Ankaraspor.

On 2 November 2008, Kewell scored his fourth league goal in Galatasaray's home win over Gaziantepspor, after a week full of overwhelming speculations in the Turkish media about his injury. Following medical consultations in Australia, it was announced on 12 December 2008 that Kewell would need surgery to repair an inguinal hernia, and the operation took place on 15 December 2008. Of the nine matches that Kewell had scored in before his injury, Galatasaray had won them all, including two UEFA Cup matches, six Süper Lig matches and a Turkish Super Cup match.

In a UEFA Cup round of 32 match against Bordeaux, Kewell scored a goal from 35 metres from goal, bringing the score to 2–1. Galatasaray ended up winning the match and proceeding to the round of 16. On 12 March 2009, during the UEFA Cup round of 16 match against Hamburger SV, Kewell had to play as a centre-back for 40 minutes after the sending off of teammate Emre Aşık, but managed to fulfill the role adequately despite playing out of position. In the second leg of the round of 16 clash, he was again played as a centre-back, scoring a penalty while doing so.

In the 2009–10 season, Kewell scored 14 goals in 28 matches in all competitions. He netted 9 times in 17 league appearances, playing as the main striker in most matches due to an injured Milan Baroš. In a 2009–10 Turkish Cup play-off, Kewell scored in a 2–1 win against Bucaspor on 28 October 2009 to put the side into the group stage phase of the tournament. Finishing on top of their group, Galatasaray were eliminated at the quarter-final stage against Antalyaspor. During the 2009–10 UEFA Europa League qualifying rounds, Kewell scored Galatasaray's second goal in a 4–1 away win against Israeli club Maccabi Netanya on 30 July 2009. Kewell would then score in a 5–0 win against Estonia's Levadia Tallinn on 20 August 2009. Galatsaray qualified for the group stage phase. On 22 October 2009, Kewell scored in a 4–1 win over Dinamo București in Istanbul. In the return leg on 5 November 2009, he scored after 22 minutes in an eventual 3–0 Galatasaray victory. Galatasaray faced Atlético Madrid in the 2009–10 UEFA Europa League knockout phase where they lost 3–2 on aggregate to the eventual champions.

On 15 August 2009, Kewell scored two penalties in a 4–1 home win to Denizlispor. Almost two weeks later, on 31 August, he scored a goal after 74 minutes in a 2–0 away win to Ankaraspor on matchday 4 of the Süper Lig season. Kewell scored his fourth goal of the campaign in a 4–3 win to Trabzonspor on 18 October. Two weeks later, he scored in a 2–0 win to Sivasspor at home on 1 November. By matchday 13, Kewell scored his sixth goal of the domestic season in a 1–1 draw to Manisaspor on 22 November. Two weeks later, on 6 December, he scored after 56 minutes in a 1–1 draw to İstanbul BŞB. Just five days later, in an away game against Antalyaspor, the game was locked at 2–2 until after 67 minutes Kewell broke the deadlock to win the match for Galatasaray 3–2 on 11 December. On 19 December, Kewell would score his ninth and final goal for Galatasaray in the 2009–10 season in a 1–0 win to Gençlerbirliği, where he netted on the 77-minute. In January, fellow Socceroo teammate and captain Lucas Neill would join Kewell at Galatasaray after he was transferred from Everton. Under coach Frank Rijkaard, Galatasaray finished third on the 2010–11 Süper Lig table, thereby qualifying for the 2010–11 Europa League third qualifying round, where Kewell's contract with Galatasaray expired after the 2009–10 season.

On 16 July 2010, it was revealed that Kewell had rejected an approach from A-League side Gold Coast United in favour of staying in Europe. Galatasaray offered a new one-year contract, but it is believed that Kewell preferred a longer-term contract. On 19 July 2010, Galatasaray announced via its official website that the parties had agreed to a one-year extension of Kewell's contract. On 21 July, the details of Kewell's contract were revealed: he would receive a lump sum fee of €1.8 million and a salary of €30,000 per match. It was also revealed that Kewell would wear number 99 for the 2010–11 season. Kewell scored his first goal of the 2010–11 season in a 1–0 win against Gaziantepspor on 14 September 2010. Kewell scored his second goal of the season against Beşiktaş in a 2–1 loss on 29 November; having been down 2–0, Kewell scored for Galatasary after 90 minutes. Kewell opened the scoring after 27 minutes as Galatasary beat Kasımpaşa 3–0 on 5 December 2010.

On 7 February 2011, Kewell scored Galatasaray's third goal in a 4–2 win against Eskişehirspor, he was substituted off the field after 63 minutes for Milan Baroš, who would then score Galatasaray's fourth goal. Following a solid but not sensational season at Galatasaray, there had been continual speculation that Kewell could be heading back home to Australia, with the Newcastle Jets reportedly a keen investor. The interest in the Socceroo coincided with Nathan Tinkler buying out the Novocastrian club in late 2010. Kewell scored his last goal for Galatasaray in a 3–2 away win against Gençlerbirliği on 15 May 2011. On 19 May 2011, Kewell's wife, Sheree Murphy, posted on Twitter that Harry would play his last game for Galatasary against Konyaspor because no contract had been offered to him. Galatasaray finished in eighth spot on the Süper Lig table with 46 points, as Kewell scored 5 goals in 20 appearances for the 2010–11 season.

Kewell was a fan favourite among Galatasaray supporters; his working discipline and dignified personality were appreciated by his teammates and board members in Galatasaray as well. He was described as fully professional with a charming character, always smiling and dedicated to his family. His nicknames at Galatasaray were "Büyücü Harry", meaning "Harry the Wizard" (inspired by Harry Potter) and the "Wizard of Oz" (Turkish: "Oz Büyücüsü").

Melbourne Victory (2011–2012)

On 20 August 2011, it was announced Kewell had signed a three-year contract with A-League club Melbourne Victory. Melbourne was hyped up with "Kewell Fever" with many hundreds of fans welcoming him at Melbourne Airport and over two thousand fans attending AAMI Park, where he was given his number 22 jersey by chairman Anthony Di Pietro. Kewell played his first friendly against Adelaide United on 23 August at Hindmarsh Stadium, coming off at half-time. Coach Mehmet Durakovic rated his performance as "phenomenal" and went on to say, "Harry's really a professional footballer, and should be ready for 8 October."

Kewell made his first appearance in the 2011–12 A-League season in a 0–0 draw against Sydney FC on 8 October in front of an attendance of 40,000 at Etihad Stadium. Kewell scored his first goal for the Victory from a penalty against Gold Coast United on 26 November 2011 at AAMI Park, Melbourne, after teammate Archie Thompson was brought down in the box in the first minute. On 31 December 2011, at Suncorp Stadium in Brisbane, Kewell scored his second goal in the fourth minute from a cracking shot outside of the box. After a slow start to his debut A-League season, he started to get his talented form back, resulting in a few best on ground performances. His fourth goal came from a free-kick just outside the box against Gold Coast United in Launceston, Tasmania, on 1 February 2012. His goal, however, was not enough to seal the match, as Melbourne conceded a late goal in the last minute from Gold Coast's Michael Thwaite to end in a 1–1 draw.

Kewell scored his fifth goal against Central Coast Mariners on 10 February from a cracking volley in the box which helped Melbourne get a crucial 2–1 win over the top side. It allowed Melbourne Victory a hope of making the finals with six matches remaining. On 18 February, Kewell scored two goals at Suncorp Stadium to give Melbourne a hope of drawing against Brisbane Roar in a classic 3–2 loss. He was taken off in the 77-minute which resulted in Melbourne Victory having a few less chances of scoring. He has scored three goals from two matches at Suncorp Stadium. Kewell did not continue with the club after his first season and returned to Europe to be closer to his mother-in-law as she battled cancer.

Al-Gharafa (2013)
On 6 April 2013, Kewell signed to Al-Gharafa in the Qatar Stars League for the remainder of the 2012–13 season as an injury replacement for fellow Australian Mark Bresciano. Kewell made his debut on 7 April as a substitute against Al Sadd. Kewell finished his third and final game of the season in Qatar with his only goal, against Qatar SC on 18 April. With the current terms of his contractual commitments to Al-Garafa completed, Kewell was seen back in Melbourne around 48 hours later, with his future career uncertain.

Melbourne Heart (2013–2014)
In June 2013, it was announced that Kewell would play for Melbourne Heart in the 2013–14 A-League season. Following the first match of the season against Melbourne Victory, Kewell was diagnosed with whiplash, ruling him out for three weeks. In training for his matchday 5 return, Kewell suffered an ankle injury. On 26 March 2014, it was announced that Kewell would retire from professional football at the end of the A-League season. His last match was on 12 April 2014 against Western Sydney Wanderers.

On 19 October 2016, it was announced that Kewell had been chosen as the recipient of the Alex Tobin Medal, Australia's most prestigious football honour, for his achievements during the course of his career.

International career

Kewell became the third youngest player to debut for the Australia national team when he played against Chile on 24 April 1996, aged 17 years and 7 months.

1998 World Cup

Qualification
In November 1997, Kewell was selected to play for Australia in the 1998 FIFA World Cup qualifying match against Iran. At the Azadi Stadium in Tehran, in front of an estimated crowd of 100,000, Kewell scored his first ever goal for his country and gave Australia a 1–0 lead. Iran eventually drew level and the game resulted in a 1–1 draw, which set up a tense return game in Melbourne.

A then-record crowd for a football match in Australia of 85,513 – at the Melbourne Cricket Ground –  witnessed the second leg of the World Cup qualifier against Iran, as well as Kewell's second goal. The Socceroos eventually stretched their lead to two goals but Iran fought back and scored two vital away goals to finish the game 2–2 and qualify for the 1998 World Cup in France on away goals.

1997 Confederations Cup
A few months after failing to qualify for the World Cup, Kewell joined Australia as it competed in the 1997 FIFA Confederations Cup. After advancing past the groups stage Australia faced Uruguay in the semi-final. Kewell scored the decisive goal two minutes into extra time with a golden goal, immediately giving Australia a 1–0 victory. Australia then faced Brazil in the final, losing 6–0.

2002 World Cup

Qualification
Kewell joined Australia as they faced Uruguay in both legs of the 2002 FIFA World Cup qualification (OFC–CONMEBOL play-off). In the first leg that was played in Melbourne, Australia led Uruguay 1–0. However, Uruguay pulled away with a 3–0 win in Montevideo. This meant Kewell and Australia spent another World Cup on the sidelines.

2003
In February 2003, Australia made headlines by upsetting England. Kewell scored Australia's second goal of the match that ended 3–1. Later that year Kewell once again added to his goal scoring record against Jamaica in a 2–1 win.

2004 OFC Nations Cup
Kewell featured in the final of the 2004 OFC Nations Cup. He featured in the second leg of the final against Solomon Islands, scoring in the 8th minute of the first half. Australia would go on to win the leg 5–0, with an overall record of 11-1 after both legs.

2006 World Cup

Qualification
On 16 November 2005, Australia qualified for the 2006 World Cup after they defeated Uruguay. It was the first time Australia had qualified for the World Cup since 1974 when it was held in West Germany. Kewell was considered instrumental in the Socceroos''' defeat of Uruguay, turning the course of the match after he came on as a substitute. After just over half an hour in the first half, a flicked pass on the left wing from Mark Viduka opened up a chance for Kewell, who then scuffed the kick. However the ball fell perfectly for Mark Bresciano who went on to score the equalizer. Kewell also scored the first penalty for Australia in the deciding penalty shoot-out, which they went on to win 4–2.

Finals
Kewell played in Australia's opening game of the 2006 World Cup against Japan in Kaiserslautern. He did not start for Australia in their second group match against Brazil, but again came on as a substitute, missing an early opportunity when Brazilian goalkeeper Dida punched the ball out dangerously. Kewell was reported to FIFA by referee Markus Merk for verbal abuse after the match but he escaped being sanctioned.

Kewell scored Australia's second goal in the 79th minute against Croatia to equal the score at 2–2 and qualify for the round of 16 for the first time. Australia only needed a draw to qualify for the round of 16. He was also awarded Man of the Match for his performance, which made him the second Australian to win the Man of the Match award at a World Cup after Tim Cahill who had won the award earlier in the tournament for his performance against Japan. Due to suspected gout, (later diagnosed as septic arthritis – a bacterial infection in the joints of his left foot) Kewell was unable to play against Italy in the knockout stage, which Australia lost 1–0 and saw Australia eliminated from the tournament.

2007 Asian Cup
Kewell did not play for the national team for a year following the World Cup, and made his national-team comeback in a friendly against Singapore on 30 June 2007. The match was Australia's last before the 2007 Asian Cup and Kewell came on as a substitute in the 65th minute, scoring his eighth international goal and providing a cross for the final goal in a 3–0 victory. Kewell was a key part of the Australian squad for their first Asian Cup. Kewell scored his ninth international goal for Australia in a 4–0 win over Thailand in the Asian Cup. After the group stage, in the quarter-final against Japan, Kewell was sent on to the pitch to replace Mark Viduka in the 61st minute, in a 1–1 draw. A penalty shootout was required to break the deadlock and Kewell's first penalty shot for Australia was stopped. Australia ultimately lost the shootout and were eliminated from the competition.

2010 World Cup
Qualification
Kewell did not play either of Australia's first two matches against Qatar and China. Kewell was made captain for Australia's qualifier against Iraq at Suncorp Stadium on 1 June 2008. He scored the only goal with a header in the 47th minute as Australia won 1–0. Kewell also scored the third goal against Qatar in Australia's 3–1 win to put them into the final qualification round. In a World Cup qualifier warm-up match against the Netherlands, he scored a penalty won by Joshua Kennedy. Australia went on to win 2–1 with Kewell playing a vital part for the national team in the first half. Australia then played Uzbekistan, winning 2–0 with Kewell scoring a penalty.

Finals
Kewell did not play in Australia's opening game of the 2010 World Cup in South Africa, a 4–0 loss to Germany. After the loss, Kewell said that the morale of the team remained high, ahead of a clash against Ghana. During the match against Ghana on 19 June, Kewell was sent off for blocking a goal by handling the ball. Standing on the goal line, Kewell attempted to block the ball from entering the goal net with his chest, however the ball ricocheted off his arm; he received a straight red card for the offence on the 24-minute. Asamoah Gyan went on to score the resulting penalty and the game was drawn 1–1, severely damaging Australia's hopes of progressing past the group stage. This was the 150th red card issued in a World Cup match. Kewell denied rumours that he was behind a supposed rift in the Socceroos camp. After the match, Kewell said that he was devastated by the decision made by referee Roberto Rosetti and felt that the red card "killed" his World Cup dream.

2011 Asian Cup
Kewell started in all of the Socceroos matches in the 2011 AFC Asian Cup, scoring three times for the green and gold in the Qatar-based tournament. His first goal came in Australia's first match, against India, with a left-footed shot from outside the penalty area. Kewell's second goal came in Australia's quarter-final match against Iraq with a header in the 118th minute in extra-time, which gave Australia a 1–0 win and put them into the semi-finals of the Asian Cup for the first time in Australia's history. Kewell continued his fine form in the semi-final against Uzbekistan by opening the scoring in the first five minutes, helping his side to a 6–0 win and progress to the final, where they were beaten 1–0 by Japan.

2014 World Cup qualifiers
In February 2012, Kewell scored his last goal for Australia in a 4–2 win over Saudi Arabia in Melbourne. He played his final game for Australia against Oman on 8 June 2012, the game finished 0–0.

Management career
Following his retirement, Kewell worked with junior players through his academy in Australia for a few months, and in 2015 he successfully completed his UEFA B and A licenses.

Watford
On 23 July 2015, Kewell was appointed head coach of the Watford Under-21 team. On 10 August 2015, Kewell coached his first game for the club, ending in a 0–0 draw at Sheffield Wednesday.

Crawley Town
On 23 May 2017, Kewell was appointed head coach of League Two club Crawley Town, becoming the first Australian to coach a professional English side. Warren Feeney  was appointed assistant manager to Kewell. Kewell's managerial debut on 5 August was a 3–1 home loss to Port Vale. Kewell guided Crawley Town to a 14th place finish in League Two, with his most successful spell consisting of 10 league wins in 14 league games between 9 December 2017 and 17 February 2018. Kewell left Crawley Town after six games into the 2018–19 season to take over at Notts County with Crawley 14th in League Two. 

Notts County
On 31 August 2018, Kewell was appointed manager of fellow League Two club Notts County, being officially announced three days later, becoming the club's fifteenth permanent manager in 10 years, with the club sitting bottom of League Two. On 13 November 2018, he was sacked after 11 league games in charge; he had won three and the team were in 22nd place, just above the relegation zone.

Oldham Athletic
On 1 August 2020, Kewell was appointed as manager of Oldham Athletic on a one-year contract with the option to extend for a further year. He became their fifth manager in the last 12 months.
He oversaw a poor first full month in charge with the side going six games without a victory in October, later achieving a record of 11 wins, 6 draws and 15 defeats for a 32% win rate.

On 7 March 2021, it was announced by Oldham Athletic that Kewell, and his assistant, Alan Maybury, had been relieved of his duties as manager. Kewell left Oldham with the club in 16th place in League Two, above their position in the previous season.

Barnet
On 10 June 2021, Kewell was appointed the new head coach of Barnet in the National League, becoming the club's 26th manager in 10 seasons. On his debut on 21 August, his side lost 5–0 at home to his former club Notts County. He was dismissed on 20 September, having lost five and drawn two of his seven games.

Celtic
On 18 June 2022, Kewell joined Scottish Premiership title holders Celtic as a first-team coach, under compatriot manager Ange Postecoglou.

Personal life
Kewell was born in Smithfield, Sydney. He is married to English soap actress Sheree Murphy, whom he met at the Majestyk nightclub in Leeds in 2000. The couple married in Las Vegas, Nevada, on 24 May 2002 and have four children.

As of May 2008, Kewell became the face of Australian men's fashion brand Politix. He advocated the introduction of Western Sydney A-League expansion team Sydney Rovers, having grown up in Smithfield in Sydney's west. He is also a supporter of Australian rugby league club Canterbury-Bankstown Bulldogs of the National Rugby League.

Career statistics
Club

International
Source:

Source:

Managerial statistics

HonoursLeeds UnitedFA Youth Cup: 1996–97LiverpoolFA Cup: 2005–06
Football League Cup runner-up 2004–05
 UEFA Champions League: 2004–05; runner-up 2006–07
FIFA Club World Cup runner-up: 2005GalatasarayTurkish Super Cup: 2008Australia U17OFC U-17 Championship: 1995Australia U20OFC U-20 Championship: 1997Australia OFC Nations Cup: 2004

FIFA Confederations Cup runner-up: 1997
AFC Asian Cup runner-up: 2011Individual Oceania Footballer of the Year: 1999, 2001, 2003

Ballon d’Or: 2001 (Nominee)
FIFA Confederations Cup All-Star Team: 1997
PFA Young Player of the Year: 1999–2000
PFA Team of the Year: 1999–2000 Premier League
AFC Asian Cup Team of the Tournament: 2007
AFC Asian Cup Quality Player: 2011
A-League Team of the Season: 2011–12
FIFA World Cup Man of the Match: 2006 vs Croatia (GS)
Leeds United Player of the Year: 1999–2000
Leeds United Goal of the Year: 1999–2000 (vs. Sheffield Wednesday)
Australia's Greatest Ever Footballer: 2012
Australia's Greatest Ever Team: 2012
Asian Football Hall of Fame: 2014
PFA Alex Tobin OAM Medal: 2016
Sport Australia Hall of Fame: 2018
Football Australia Hall of Fame: 2019Orders'''
 Medal of the Order of Australia (OAM): 2016

References

External links

 Melbourne Victory profile 
 
 Profile at Galatasaray.org
 Profile at LFChistory.net
 Profile at OzFootball.net
 
 
 
 
 
 

1978 births
Living people
Australian people of English descent
Soccer players from Sydney
Australian soccer players
Association football wingers
Australia youth international soccer players
Australia under-20 international soccer players
Australia international soccer players
1997 FIFA Confederations Cup players
2004 OFC Nations Cup players
2006 FIFA World Cup players
2007 AFC Asian Cup players
2010 FIFA World Cup players
2011 AFC Asian Cup players
Marconi Stallions FC players
Leeds United F.C. players
Liverpool F.C. players
Galatasaray S.K. footballers
Melbourne Victory FC players
Al-Gharafa SC players
Melbourne City FC players
Premier League players
Süper Lig players
Marquee players (A-League Men)
A-League Men players
Qatar Stars League players
UEFA Champions League winning players
Sport Australia Hall of Fame inductees
Australian expatriate soccer players
Australian expatriate sportspeople in England
Australian expatriate sportspeople in Turkey
Australian expatriate sportspeople in Qatar
Expatriate footballers in England
Expatriate footballers in Turkey
Expatriate footballers in Qatar
Australian soccer coaches
Watford F.C. non-playing staff
Crawley Town F.C. managers
Notts County F.C. managers
Oldham Athletic A.F.C. managers
Barnet F.C. managers
Celtic F.C. non-playing staff
English Football League managers
National League (English football) managers
Australian expatriate soccer coaches
Expatriate football managers in England
Naturalised citizens of the United Kingdom
People educated at Westfields Sports High School
FA Cup Final players